Clarence Victor Iba (April 20, 1909 – April 21, 1997) was the head basketball coach at the University of Tulsa.  Iba coached the Tulsa Golden Hurricane men's basketball team for eleven seasons, from 1949 to 1960.  He is the brother of former Oklahoma State coach Henry Iba.

When Iba was hired in 1949, he became Tulsa's first full-time basketball coach.  Iba led the team to a NIT appearance in 1953, the first postseason appearance for Tulsa in the modern era.  Tulsa also made the Associated Press college basketball rankings for the first time in the 1952–53 season, reaching as high as #8 in the poll.  The 1954–55 season was Iba's best at the school.  Tulsa won the Missouri Valley Conference with a 21–7 record, including 8–2 in conference.  This was the first twenty-win season in school history.  Tulsa advanced to the 1955 NCAA Tournament, its first appearance in that tourney.  After being eliminated in the first round, Tulsa won the consolation bracket.  Additionally, Tulsa's first all-American, Bob Patterson, was from that same 1954–55 campaign.

Iba's last few years at Tulsa were not as successful as the 1954–55 campaign.  He does, however, have the longest coaching tenure in school history, and his 137 wins were the most in Tulsa history until Doug Wojcik passed him in 2012.  Following his career as a coach, he worked as a marketing executive in Fort Worth, Texas.   Iba was inducted into the University of Tulsa Hall of Fame in 1994.

Iba died on April 21, 1997 of an aortic aneurysm.

Head coaching record

References 

1909 births
1997 deaths
American men's basketball players
Basketball coaches from Texas
Basketball players from Texas
High school basketball coaches in the United States
Northwest Missouri State Bearcats men's basketball players
Sportspeople from Fort Worth, Texas
Tulsa Golden Hurricane men's basketball coaches